HMAS Aitape (P 84) was an  of the Royal Australian Navy (RAN). It was named for the small town of Aitape, Sandaun Province, Papua New Guinea. Completed in 1967, the vessel was one of five assigned to the RAN's Papua New Guinea (PNG) Division. The patrol boat was transferred to the Papua New Guinea Defence Force in 1974 as HMPNGS Aitape. She remained active until 1982, when she was removed from service for use as a parts hulk. Aitape was scuttled off Port Moresby for use as a dive wreck in 1995.

Design and construction

The Attack class was ordered in 1964 to operate in Australian waters as patrol boats (based on lessons learned through using the s on patrols of Borneo during the Indonesia-Malaysia Confrontation), and to replace a variety of old patrol, search-and-rescue, and general-purpose craft. Initially, fourteen were ordered for the RAN, five of which were intended for the Papua New Guinea Division of the RAN, although another six ships were ordered to bring the class to twenty vessels.

Propulsion machinery consisted of two 16-cylinder Paxman YJCM diesel engines, which supplied  to the two propellers. The ship's company consisted of three officers and sixteen sailors. Main armament was a bow-mounted Bofors 40 mm gun, supplemented by two .50-calibre M2 Browning machine guns and various small arms. The ships were designed with as many commercial components as possible: the Attacks were to operate in remote regions of Australia and New Guinea, and a town's hardware store would be more accessible than home base in a mechanical emergency.

Aitape was laid down by Walkers Limited at Maryborough, Queensland, launched on 6 July 1967 by Mrs. Paliau Maloat, the wife of the a Manus leader and politician, and commissioned on 13 November 1967, four days before lead ship .

Operational history
Aitape undertook sea trials with sister ship Attack off Sydney, before heading for Papua New Guinea and arriving at the RAN base  at Los Negros Island, Manus Province on 3 January 1968. Primary roles of the new patrol boats were fisheries protection and sea training, but also undertook search and rescue, medical evacuation and monitoring of navigational aids roles. The ship's company was made up of both Australian and PNG servicemen. Prior to the arrival of the Attack-class patrol boats, surveillance of PNG waters was conducted by small coastal craft and occasional visits by larger RAN warships, but the PNG Division was now able to chase and apprehend vessels suspected of illegal fishing.

Aitape was one of the five Attack-class patrol boats of the RAN PNG Division transferred to the Papua New Guinea Defence Force's (PNGDF) Maritime Element on 14 November 1974 when the PNGDF took over maritime functions from the RAN. They formed the PNGDF Patrol Boat Squadron based at Manus. She served until 1982, when she was paid off to act as a source of spares for the other Attack-class patrol boats in PNGDF service. In 1995, she was sunk in shallow waters as dive wreck south east of Port Moresby.

Citations

References

Attack-class patrol boats
1967 ships
Ships built in Queensland